Googong Foreshores is a heritage-listed historic precinct at London Bridge Road, Burra, New South Wales, Australia. It consists of the historic surroundings of the Googong Dam that predated the dam itself. It is also known as the Googong Foreshores Cultural and Geodiversity Heritage Areas. It was added to the Australian Commonwealth Heritage List on 3 November 2017.

History 

There is evidence that Aboriginal people occupied the area in the vicinity of the Queanbeyan River. Googong Foreshores contains physical evidence of Aboriginal occupation, including sites containing stone artefact scatters, a scarred tree, cairns (potentially associated with burials) and campsites. An excavation of a shelter immediately outside Burra Cave revealed some quartz flaking debris and two hearths "dating from 700 to 900 BP with some charred bone material".

In 1823, the "London Bridge" arch was first described by Captain Mark Currie during exploration in which he named the Monaro Plains. In 1834, Joseph Kenyon started a cattle run at 'Katy's Flat' but soon forced to leave due to poor conditions.

Two pastoral properties were established in the area, divided by the Burra Creek. The west bank was granted to William Hutchinson in 1836, who conducted the "Burra Estate", a pastoral run of 5293 acres, in absentia. The east bank was acquired by John McNamara Sr. through Crown grant and selection in 1857, and was later known as "London Bridge". In 1872, McNamara acquired 1902 acres of the Burra Estate and began farming sheep.

McNamara Sr died in 1901, and his son, John McNamara Jr, inherited the property and moved there to live. The estate was sharply reduced in 1904 by the auction of 3442 acres from London Bridge North, and in 1908 McNamara Jr. and his family left the district for Sydney. They leased the property to Fred Campbell of Woden, who installed Arthur Warwick as overseer.

In 1912, the lease expired on the London Bridge homestead, and McNamara Jr. leased his property to his neighbour at London Bridge, James Moore. McNamara Jr. returned to London Bridge in 1914, but died in residence in 1915. The property was again leased to the Moores until being sold to Edward and Jim Noone on 21 January 1921.

London Bridge Homestead was purchased by Robert Douglas in 1928, and shearing at the old woolshed ceased in the same year. Sheep were shorn at Burra Station for a period until Douglas commissioned a new woolshed during the Depression years. The orchard was planted or extended at this time. Electric power was connected to London Bridge HOmestead in 1954 at a cost of £200.

In 1973, 5089 hectares of land, including London Bridge, north and south, was acquired by the Commonwealth of Australia from New South Wales for the creation of the Googong Reservoir Foreshores. Andrew Douglas leased a section of the London Bridge Homestead property back from the Commonwealth. The Commonwealth enacted the Canberra Water Supply (Googong Dam) Act 1974 (Googong Dam Act) in 1974. This Act vested control over water supply and management of the Googong Dam Area in the Australian Capital Territory Executive, acting on behalf of the Commonwealth.

The construction of Googong Dam was completed in 1978. In 1983, the ACT government commissioned Philip Cox and Associates to prepare a Conservation Management Plan for the London Bridge Homestead. In 1999, conservation work was undertaken at London Bridge Homestead.

Description 

The Googong Foreshores Cultural and Geodiversity Heritage Area is a 223 hectare area of land largely cleared for pastoral use. A small river called Burra Creek runs through the place. There is also a collection of farm buildings including the London Bridge Homestead group, a woolshed and squatter's quarters.

The London Bridge Homestead group of buildings is located near to Burra Creek and the buildings are arranged to form an "L" shape. Four buildings are included in the homestead group: a stone cottage, a slab hut, a lath and plaster building, and a weatherboard building with a fibro annex.

The woolshed and shearer's quarters are located approximately 1.5 km away from the homestead.

The area also includes a distinctive natural limestone formation, London Bridge Arch, which acts as a natural bridge over a section of the Burra Creek. London Bridge Arch formed in limestone containing fossils of brachiopods, corals, crinoids and trilobites. It developed, along with several smaller caves, from erosion at a meander bend in Burra Creek. Formation of the arch resulted in a meander cut off which occurs when the two closest parts of a meander bend are directly connected, usually causing the river to abandon the meander loop and continue straight downstream. An abandoned meander loop is visible east of Burra Creek.

The limestone which contains the arch and caves is a small lens (approximately 50m by 150m) developed in the late Silurian Cappanana Formation. The arch is 34m long, about 12-18m wide and 5m high, while 5-7m vertical cliffs occur above both entrances to the arch. Two through caves, containing patches of flowstone and Pleistocene fossil deposits, occur in the limestone above the level of the arch. These caves, Douglas and Burra, are older creek passages. Several other small caves and shelters also occur in the limestone.

Condition 

The condition of the buildings in the London Bridge complex has been described as fair to good. The buildings have previously been conserved to a high standard, although it is unclear how much work has been undertaken on them since 2002. The buildings have retained much of their original fabric.

London Bridge Arch is in good condition with some minor insignificant damage occurring within the caves. Historic and recent visitor use has compacted some of the cave deposits and destroyed some surface fossils, and historic graffiti is evident within the Douglas and Burra caves. The surrounding landscape is mostly highly modified former pastoral country.

Heritage listing 
The Googong Foreshores Cultural and Geodiversity Heritage Area is an important heritage area because of its ability to demonstrate the region's pastoral, Aboriginal, geological and natural history, including through its archaeological deposits.

The place demonstrates a number of settlement and pastoral practices used in the area and wider region. The place and the buildings within it demonstrate past living conditions, rare nineteenth and early twentieth century historic building techniques and later evolution in building practice.

The London Bridge Arch and its associated cave deposits are also significant. The Arch is valued because of its ability to demonstrate karst processes. The Arch also provides insight into the evolution of the local natural landscape. The cave deposits provide further insight into past flora and fauna regimes of the area.

The London Bridge Arch and London Bridge Homestead building group are also valued for their aesthetic appeal appreciated by the local community.

Googong Foreshores was listed on the Australian Commonwealth Heritage List on 3 November 2017 having satisfied the following criteria.

Criterion A: Processes

The Googong Foreshores Cultural and Geodiversity Heritage area has important historic heritage value because of the place's ability to demonstrate aspects of the pastoral history of the Canberra and Queanbeyan region.

The features which express this value include, but are not limited to, the location of the homestead and associated farm buildings near to Burra Creek, the arrangement of the remnant farm buildings, their function and architecture including the building materials used and the demonstration of historic building methods. The buildings and the buildings within their surroundings demonstrate aspects of the living conditions experienced by the people living and working on the pastoral property.

The place also has significant heritage value for providing insight into the development of the local landscape as it demonstrates a naturally eroded limestone arch and caves formed at a meander bend, resulting in a meander cut-off and the eventual abandonment of a meander loop.

Features which express this value are the London Bridge Arch and associated caves, Burra Creek and the abandoned meander loop visible to the east of the arch.

Criterion B: Rarity

The Googong Foreshores Cultural and Geodiversity Heritage area has important heritage value because of the place's possession of rare aspects of the Canberra region's vernacular and rural architecture.

The features which express this value include, but are not limited to, the building fabric of the London Bridge Homestead and all associated rural buildings.

The place also has significant heritage value for the presence of a rare and unusual geological formation, London Bridge Arch and its associated caves.

Criterion C: Research

The Googong Foreshores Cultural and Geodiversity Heritage area has important research value because of the place's ability to provide information that will lead to a better understanding of the establishment and development of pastoral properties in the Canberra and Queanbeyan region. The buildings are also an important historic record. In part the place also represents pastoral practices implemented more widely beyond the immediate region.

Features which express this value include, but are not limited to, the built fabric of the place, the location, function and arrangement of rural buildings and their proximity to Burra Creek plus the place's demonstration of establishment processes such as land clearing, use of water, field and stock management.

The place also has significant heritage value for its ability to provide information that will lead to a wider understanding of Aboriginal use of the area over time. These archaeological values occur throughout the entire place.

The place also has significant heritage value due to its potential to provide additional information on the formation of the local landscape and the past flora and fauna assemblages of the Burra Creek Valley.

Features which express this value include, but are not limited to, the London Bridge Arch and caves incorporating rich Pleistocene cave deposits and fossil remains of large and small mammal species, some of which are locally extinct.

Criterion D: Characteristic values

The Googong Foreshores Cultural and Geodiversity Heritage area has significant heritage value for its importance in demonstrating the principal characteristics of cave formation in the local region due to karst processes.

Features which express this value are the London Bridge Arch and associated caves, Burra Creek and the abandoned meander loop visible to the east of the arch.

Criterion E: Aesthetic characteristics

The London Bridge Arch is an unusual and attractive natural landmark valued by the local community.

Features which express this value include the dramatic form of the natural arch, its demonstration of geological processes and its association with Burra Creek, the small, natural river course flowing underneath. The presence of water is an important part of its aesthetic appeal.

The London Homestead group of buildings (excluding the shearer's quarters and woolshed) within its rural setting is valued by the local community for its picturesque quality. These aesthetic characteristics are best appreciated by homestead visitors walking in the area. Distant views and immediate views of the London Homestead group of buildings are important.

Features which express this value include, but are not limited to, distant and immediate views of the London Homestead group of buildings, the historic character of the homestead group of buildings, the vernacular building materials used and the presentation of these buildings within their wider rural setting.

References

Bibliography 
 ACT Government, 2005, A Vision of the Grassy Plains Extended: ACT Lowland Native Grassland Conservation Strategy. Action Plan no. 28, Department of Arts, Heritage and Environment, Canberra.
 ACT Government, 2007, Googong Foreshores Draft Plan of Management, Department of Territory and Municipal Services - Parks, Conservation and Lands, Canberra.
 ACT Government 2015 - Googong Foreshores - Territory and Municipal Services, available at: http://www.tams.act.gov.au/parks-recreation/water_catchments/rural_water_catchments/googong_foreshores
 ACT Museums and Galleries 2015, 'Lanyon Homestead Guide' http://www.museumsandgalleries.act.gov.au/lanyon/pdf/Lanyon_brochure.pdf
 AHDB 1182, Register of the National Estate - London Bridge Natural Arch, Australian Heritage Database, ID1182, Australian Government Department of the Environment, available at http://www.environment.gov.au/cgi-bin/ahdb/search.pl?mode=place_detail;search=place_name%3Dlondon%2520bridge%3Bkeyword_PD%3Don%3Bkeyword_SS%3Don%3Bkeyword_PH%3Don%3Blatitude_1dir%3DS%3Blongitude_1dir%3DE%3Blongitude_2dir%3DE%3Blatitude_2dir%3DS%3Bin_region%3Dpart;place_id=1182
 Australian Heritage Database, ID 1174, Place details - 'London Bridge Homestead Group' available at http://www.environment.gov.au/cgi-bin/ahdb/search.pl?mode=place_detail;search=place_name%3Dlondon%2520bridge%3Bkeyword_PD%3Don%3Bkeyword_SS%3Don%3Bkeyword_PH%3Don%3Blatitude_1dir%3DS%3Blongitude_1dir%3DE%3Blongitude_2dir%3DE%3Blatitude_2dir%3DS%3Bin_region%3Dpart;place_id=1174
 Australian National University (ANU), 2015, Australian National Dictionary Centre, available at: http://andc.anu.edu.au/australian-words/meanings-origins?field_alphabet_value=241
 Boot, P and Cooke, H, 1990, Conservation and Management Plan for London Bridge Karst Area, Googong Foreshores Reserve, A Report to the ACT Heritage Unit, Department of Environment, Land and Planning, ACT Government Services, Canberra.
 Brennan, M, 1907 Reminiscences of the goldfields and elsewhere in New South Wales covering a period of forty-eight years of service as an office of Police¸ Brooks, Sydney
 Butz, M, 1987, Karst and caves in the Canberra area - past and future management in Spate, AP (ed), Cave management in Australia VII: Proc. 7th Australasian conference on cave tourism and management, SE NSW, 1987. NSW NPWS, Sydney and Australian Speleological Federation, Broadway. Available at: www.markbutz.com/Butz%201987%20Karst%20and%20caves%20in%20the%20Canberra%20area.pdf (Accessed 1/10/2015).
 Canberra and District Heritage Society (CDHS) 2015, 'Canberra History' available at: http://www.canberrahistory.org.au/discover.asp 
 Currie, JM, 1825, Journal of an excursion to the southward of Lake George in New South Wales, in Field, B (ed.), Geographical memoirs on New South Wales, John Murray, London, pp 367-381, as cited in Butz (1987).
 Eddy, D, 2009, Googong Foreshores Grassland and Woodland Vegetation Survey and Mapping, Report to ACT Parks, Conservation and Lands, Research and Planning (Unpublished).
 Environment ACT, 2005, National Recovery Plan for Natural Temperate Grassland of the Southern Tablelands (NSW and ACT): an endangered ecological community, Environment ACT, Canberra.
 Environmental Resources Management (ERM) 2008a, Googong Foreshores ACT: Heritage Assessment, Vol 1, July 2008, Pyrmont, NSW, Australia.
 Environmental Resources Management (ERM) 2008b, Googong Foreshores ACT: Aboriginal Heritage Assessment, Vol 2, July 2008, Pyrmont, NSW, Australia.
 Finlayson, D, 2014, Introduction to Geoheritage Sites in the Canberra Region, 2014, Canberra region landscapes - formed throughout geological time, Site 15 - London Bridge, Geological Society of Australia (Australian Capital Territory Division). Available at: www.gsa.org.au/heritage/ACT%20Geoheritage.html (Accessed 16/10/2015).
 Flood, J., 1996 Moth Hunters of the Australian Capital Territory. Aboriginal Traditional Life in the Canberra Region. J. M. Flood, ACT. National Capital Development Commission, 1978, Googong Homestead, Department of Construction, ACT Region

Freeman, J. pers comm 2017 
 Hope, JH, 1976, Quaternary fossil mammal localities in south-eastern New South Wales and eastern Victoria, (unpublished manuscript), as cited in Butz (1987).
 Jennings, JN, Brush, JB, Nicoll, RS, and Spate, AP, 1976 'Karst stream self-capture at London Bridge, Burra Creek, NSW,' Australian Geographer, 13:238-49
 Kwok, N, 2013, Considering Traditional Aboriginal Affiliations in the ACT Region (draft report) Australian Capital Territory Government: 49
 Available at: http://www.cmd.act.gov.au/__data/assets/pdf_file/0020/442316/Draft-report_redacted.pdf
 Ngambri, 2014. 'Where is Ngambri Country?' viewed 16 March 2017, <http://www.ngambri.org/about.html#where>
 NSW OEH, 2015, London Bridge Arch, NSW Government Office of Environment and Heritage. Available at: www.environment.nsw.gov.au/heritageapp/ViewHeritageItemDetails.aspx?ID=2921703 (Accessed 16/10/2015).
 Olsen, J, Fuentes, E, and Rose, AB, 2006a,'Trophic relationships between neighbouring White-bellied Sea-Eagles (Haliaeetus leucogaster) and Wedge-tailed Eagles (Aquila audax) breeding on rivers and dams near Canberra', Emu, 106: 193-201.
 Olsen, J, Fuentes, E, Rose, AB, and Trost, S, 2006b, 'Food and hunting of eight breeding raptors near Canberra, 1990-1994', Australian Field Ornithology, 23: 77-95.
 Olsen, J, Judge, D, Fuentes, E, Rose, AB, and Debus, SJS, 2010, 'Diets of Wedge-tailed Eagles (Aquila audax) and Little Eagles (Hieraaetus morphnoides) breeding near Canberra, Australia,' Journal of Raptor Research, 44(1): 50-61.
 Pearson, M. and Lennon, J. 2010 Pastoral Australia - Fortunes, Failures and Hard Yakka - A historical overview 1788 - 1967 Commonwealth of Australia, Canberra, ACT, Australia.
 Reid, David, 2015, 'Canberry' available at http://www.davesact.com/2010/05/canberry.html
 Smith, M 1975 Googong Dam Field Survey. ACT Heritage Study. A strategy for the Conservation of Places of Cultural Heritage Significance. Working Paper no. 5 - Interpretation.
 Spate, A, 1993 'Karsting around for bones. Aborigines and karst caves in south eastern Australia' in Helictite 31 (1):18
 TAMS, 2010, ACT kangaroo management plan, ACT Government Territory and Municipal Services, available at www.tams.act.gov.au/__data/assets/pdf_file/0012/394698/Kangaroo_Management_Plan_complete_for_web.pdf (Accessed 8/10/2015).
 TAMS, 2015, Googong Foreshores. ACT Government Territory and Municipal Services, available at www.tams.act.gov.au/parks-conservation/parks-and-reserves/find-a-park/rural/googong-foreshores (Accessed 1/10/2015).
 Traveller, 2011, 'London Bridge and its secret cave,' Tim the Yowie Man, Traveller, published 14 May 2011. Available at: www.traveller.com.au/london-bridge-and-its-secret-cave-22rfk (Accessed 19/10/2015).
 University of Canberra, 2015, available at: http://www.canberra.edu.au/coursesandunits/course?course_cd=955AA&version_number=2
 Veevers, JJ, 1953, The London Bridge limestone, Monaro District, New South Wales Bureau of Mineral Resources, Geology and Geophysics, Canberra, ACT
 VisitCanberra, 2015, Googong Foreshores, VisitCanberra, Australian Capital Territory Government. Available at: visitcanberra.com.au/attractions/9003041/googong-foreshores (Accessed 19/10/2015).
 Visit Queanbeyan, 2015, London Bridge Arch, Visit Queanbeyan. Available at: www.visitqueanbeyan.com.au/london-bridge (Accessed 19/10/2015).
 Weekend Notes, 2013, 'London Bridge Arch', Diana Tan, Weekend Notes, published 10 August 2013. Available at: www.weekendnotes.com/london-bridge-new-south-wales/ (Accessed 19/10/2015).

Attribution 

Commonwealth Heritage List places in New South Wales
Queanbeyan–Palerang Regional Council
Historic precincts in Australia
Articles incorporating text from the Australian Heritage Database